Sarayuth Chaikamdee (born September 24, 1981), simply known as Joe, is a Thai retired professional footballer who previously played for Pisico Bình Định in the V-League. He is a striker and is known in Thailand as "Joe five yards" because he mainly score goals within the 5 yards box. Over the years, his nickname has now changed to "Joe every-yard" due to his improvement in longer range shooting ability.

Club career

He was voted the 2010 Thai League Cup player of the tournament despite missing out on the final due to suspension. His side, Thai Port F.C. defeated Buriram PEA F.C. 2–1 in the final.

International career

He scored the winning goal for Thailand, to send them through to the 3rd round of the Asian Qualifying zone, in their victory of Yemen (2–1 aggregate) for the World Cup Qualifying in South Africa 2010.

International matches

International goals

Honours

Club
Thai Port
 Thai League Cup (1): 2010

International
Thailand
 King's Cup (2): 2006, 2007
Thailand U-23
 Sea Games  Gold Medal (1); 2003

Individual
 Thai Premier League Top Scorer (2): 2002-2003, 2004–05
 Thai Premier League Player of the Month (1): June 2010

References

External links
 Profile at Goal

1981 births
Living people
Sarayuth Chaikamdee
Sarayuth Chaikamdee
Association football forwards
Sarayuth Chaikamdee
Binh Dinh FC players
Sarayuth Chaikamdee
Sarayuth Chaikamdee
Sarayuth Chaikamdee
Sarayuth Chaikamdee
Sarayuth Chaikamdee
Sarayuth Chaikamdee
Sarayuth Chaikamdee
Sarayuth Chaikamdee
Sarayuth Chaikamdee
Sarayuth Chaikamdee
Sarayuth Chaikamdee
V.League 1 players
Sarayuth Chaikamdee
Thai expatriate sportspeople in Vietnam
Expatriate footballers in Vietnam
Sarayuth Chaikamdee
Sarayuth Chaikamdee
Southeast Asian Games medalists in football
Competitors at the 2003 Southeast Asian Games